Bostrychoplites is a genus of beetle native to the Afro-tropical region. Its presence in Europe is doubtful.

External links
Bostrychoplites at Fauna Europaea

Bostrichidae